Hansruedi Fässler (born 11 January 1949) is a retired Swiss football defender and later manager.

References

1949 births
Living people
Swiss men's footballers
Association football defenders
Swiss football managers
SC Kriens managers
FC Vaduz managers